Saridacma is a monotypic moth genus in the family Copromorphidae. Its only species, Saridacma ilyopis, is found in Brazil. Both the genus and the species were first described by Edward Meyrick in 1930.

References

Copromorphidae
Moths described in 1930
Monotypic moth genera